Hwasun County (화순군; Hwasun-gun) is a county in South Jeolla Province, South Korea.

Symbol
 County Flower : Wild Chrysanthemum
 County Tree : Zelkova Tree
 County Bird : Dove

History
Before Hwasun became an administrative community in the Japanese Empire, individual culture was formed along three rivers: Jiseokcheon River to Neungju, Hwasuncheon River to Hwasun, and Dongbokcheon River to Dongbok.
Recently relics in the Stone Age (residential remains) and in the Middle Stone Age were found in Juam Dam at Daejeon Village, Sasu-ri, Nam-myeon, showing that people lived from old times. 
Bronze Age remains include 1,180 dolmens and a variety of remains excavated in a stone-lines tomb at Daegok-ri (including National Tresture No. 143, bronze knife and bronze mirror). A pit-tomb in the Baekje Period was found at the site of Unjusa Temple.

Climate

Culture and Tourism
Red Cliff (赤壁)
Unjusa (云 住 寺)
Ssangbongsa (双峰 寺)
Mudeungsan (无 等 山)
Towon Academy (道 源 书院)
Hwasun Nongak Hanchun (和顺 寒泉 农 乐)

World Heritages
A dolmen is a grave at the prehistoric age and a kind of megalithic monument. It is distributed all over the world and Korea is its center. There are about 19,000 only in Jeonnam. 
Hwasun is a representative center of dolmen and has about 2,000. Since 1988, the dolmen in Hwasun was designated as cultural asset.

Present situation of Dolmens

 Designation : Historic Relic No. 410(Designated on Sept. 17, 1998) 
 Address : Hoysan-ri, Dogok-myeon ~ Daesin-ri, Chunyang-myeon, Hwasun-gun 
 Designated area : 2,191,767 m2(about 663,000 pyeong) 
 Quantity : Daesin-ri, Chunyang - 319 Hyosan-ri, Dogok - 277 Total 596

Features of Hwasun Dolmen
Collective tight formation in a small area. 
Tens of dolmens have 100-ton upper stone in weight. There are extra-large dolmens of 280 tons. 
A quarry remains to show the process of building dolmens. Dolmens of Hwasun,   were registered with those of Ganghwa and Gochang county.

References

External links
 Hwasun County government home page

 
Counties of South Jeolla Province